Wiener-Dog is a 2016 American comedy film directed and written by Todd Solondz. Starring an ensemble cast led by Ellen Burstyn, Kieran Culkin, Julie Delpy, Danny DeVito, Greta Gerwig, Tracy Letts, and Zosia Mamet, the film serves as a spin-off from Solondz's 1995 film Welcome to the Dollhouse, which also features the character of Dawn Wiener. The film is also inspired by the 1966 drama Au Hasard Balthazar, directed by Robert Bresson.

The film had its world premiere at the 2016 Sundance Film Festival on January 22, 2016. before receiving a limited release on June 24, 2016, by Amazon Studios and IFC Films.

Plot
Danny brings his cancer-surviving son Remi a wiener dog. His wife Dina does not want to deal with caring for the dog, but Danny informs her Remi is mature and old enough to help the two with the responsibilities. Dina brings Wiener-Dog to the vet to get spayed, and on their way, Remi becomes upset. Dina comforts Remi by telling him an embellished story about her childhood dog, which she claims died after giving birth to a litter of stillborn puppies. During Dina and Danny's yoga class, Remi and Wiener-Dog tear up the couch cushions and cover the living room in feathers. Wiener Dog wanders off into the kitchen, and Remi feeds her a chocolate chip granola bar. Wiener-Dog becomes very ill and spreads diarrhoea around the house. The next day, Danny brings Wiener-Dog to the vet to be euthanized.

At the vet, veterinary nurse Dawn Wiener takes Wiener-Dog from the consultation room before the vet can euthanise her. She brings Wiener-Dog home with her, where she nurses the dog back to life. It is loosely implied that she is estranged from her family. One day while shopping for pet food, she runs into her old ex-boyfriend (from junior high) Brandon, who invites her to visit his brother Tommy and his wife April, both with Down syndrome, in Ohio. Dawn agrees, and the two head off to Ohio, where they come across homesick Mexican hitchhikers. Once they arrive in Ohio, Brandon informs his brother that their father had died due to alcoholism. Tommy asks Brandon to stop doing drugs, and Brandon promises he has stopped, even though he was shown injecting drugs earlier in the trip. Dawn offers to leave Wiener-Dog with Tommy and April, who happily accept. On their way home, Dawn and Brandon talk about their future together and happily hold hands.

During an intermission, Wiener-Dog is seen wandering across America, via strip clubs, motels and crime scenes.

Wiener-Dog then arrives with Dave Schmerz, a screenwriting professor who is attempting to get his second screenplay off the ground. One day at work, Schmerz is informed that various students and administration members are complaining about his constant negativity. In the meeting, he tearfully explains that he had tried to put real emotion into his script, but he compromised and added funny elements to make it more commercial, thus ruining it. Schmerz is asked to attend a discussion with a previous student who became a famous film director, who mocks Schmerz's teaching and encourages the students to drop out. Schmerz creates a bomb and attaches it to Wiener-Dog. Students notice and contact authorities. Dave gets stopped by authorities investigating the incident on the way home and willingly identifies himself.

Elderly Nana, who lives with her caregiver Yvette, is Wiener-Dog's final owner. She names her "Cancer." Nana receives a call from her granddaughter Zoe, who is on her way to visit for the first time in several years, along with her boyfriend Fantasy, a conceptual artist. Once Zoe arrives, she asks for money in order to pay for Fantasy's new art project. Nana agrees to give her the money. While filling out the check, Zoe confides in her Nana, wondering if Fantasy is cheating on her. Once Zoe leaves, Nana goes outside and sits with Wiener-Dog, where she dreams about a younger version of herself coming back to show her what her life could have been if she had been more positive. She wakes up to discover Wiener-Dog has run away. She then spots Wiener-Dog being run over and killed by a truck.

Six months later, a stuffed animatronic Wiener-Dog is displayed in Fantasy's art exhibit.

Cast
First story
 Keaton Nigel Cooke as Remi
 Tracy Letts as Danny
 Julie Delpy as Dina

Second story
 Greta Gerwig as Dawn Wiener
 Kieran Culkin as Brandon McCarthy
 Haraldo Alvarez as Luis
 Rigoberto Garcia as Jose
 Dain Eulogio-Victoriano as Jose Luis
 Connor Long as Tommy
 Bridget Brown as April

Intermission

Third story
 Danny DeVito as Dave Schmerz
 Sharon Washington as Phillips
 Devin Druid as Dwight
 Trey Silver as Peter Jacobson
 Ari Graynor as Carol Steinhart
 Kett Turton as Director
 Samrat Chakrabarti as Dr. Farhard Rahman
 Trey Gerrald as Zeno
 Clara Mamet as Lina
 Katherine Reis as Rafa

Fourth story
 Ellen Burstyn as Nana
 Melo Ludwig as Young Nana
 Zosia Mamet as Zoe
 Michael Shaw as Fantasy
 Marcella Lowery as Yvette

Production
On October 23, 2014, The Hollywood Reporter reported that Todd Solondz would next write and direct the comedy Wiener-Dog with Julie Delpy and Greta Gerwig attached as stars, Gerwig playing Dawn Wiener. Megan Ellison would produce and finance through Annapurna Pictures, with Christine Vachon also producing through Killer Films. On June 24, 2015, the complete cast of the film was announced, which included Brie Larson, Kieran Culkin, Zosia Mamet, Danny DeVito, Ellen Burstyn, and Tracy Letts. Ed Lachman served as the film's cinematographer. Solondz initially wrote the script several years prior to making the film, but was unable to find financing.

Filming
Principal photography on the film began on June 24, 2015. Filming lasted a total of 30 days, with shooting taking place in and around New York City and Nyack, New York.

Post-production
During post-production, Brie Larson was cut out of the film.

Music
James Lavino and Nathan Larson composed the film's score. "The Ballad of Wiener-Dog", a song from the film, was short listed for Best Original Song at the 89th Academy Awards.

Release
In December 2015, two images from the film were released, including one of Gerwig. The film had its world premiere at the Sundance Film Festival on January 22, 2016. It went onto screen at the Seattle International Film Festival on May 29, 2016. Shortly after, it was announced that Amazon Studios had acquired distribution rights to the film. In April 2016, it was announced IFC Films would be partnering with Amazon on releasing the film. The film was released on June 24, 2016. The film was released in the United Kingdom on August 12, 2016, by Picturehouse Entertainment.

Reception
Wiener-Dog received positive reviews from film critics. It holds a 74% approval rating on review aggregator website Rotten Tomatoes, based on 108 reviews, with an average rating of 6.6/10. The website's critical consensus reads, "For filmgoers predisposed to enjoy Todd Solondz' brand of black comedy, Wiener-Dog won't disappoint — but those put off by previous works need not apply." On Metacritic, the film holds a rating of 66 out of 100, based on 34 critics, indicating "Generally favorable reviews".

Guy Lodge of Variety gave the film a positive review, writing: "Each of their mini-narratives plays out in the pause-heavy mode of highly mannered mundanity that will feel entirely natural to Solondz acolytes — and, it seems, to the actors, most of whom tackle the director’s customarily arch dialogue with brusque aplomb. Delpy, in particular, was born to deliver his harshest words, though it’s Burstyn — using very few at all, her set face shifting and falling as the script lends reasoning to her froideur — whom viewers might find themselves unable to shake." Todd McCarthy of The Hollywood Reporter gave the film a positive review writing: "These last minutes are the best in the film and by far the most visually dazzling, even though Ed Lachman’s cinematography throughout stands as a model of subtle and elegant compositional skill tested by what are, for the most part, deliberately banal settings." World Socialist Web Site reviewer David Walsh gave the film a positive review, commenting that "the hostility directed toward the contemporary art and film scene is perhaps the strongest feature of Wiener-Dog."

References

External links
 
 
 
 
 
 

2016 films
2016 comedy films
American anthology films
American comedy films
American independent films
2010s English-language films
Films about dogs
Films about pets
Films set in New York City
Films set in Ohio
Films shot in New York City
Films produced by Christine Vachon
Films produced by Megan Ellison
Films directed by Todd Solondz
Annapurna Pictures films
Killer Films films
IFC Films films
Amazon Studios films
Down syndrome in film
2016 independent films
2010s American films